The Ortoli Commission is the European Commission that held office from 6 January 1973 to 5 January 1977. Its President was François-Xavier Ortoli.

Work
It was the successor to the Mansholt Commission and was succeeded by the Jenkins Commission. It was the first Commission since the first enlargement at the start of the year. It managed the extended Community during the instability of the Yom Kippur war, the 1973 oil crisis and the Turkish invasion of Cyprus.

Membership

Summary by political leanings 

The colour of the row indicates the approximate political leaning of the office holder using the following scheme:

See also
 Budgetary Treaty

References

External links
 European Commission Website
 PDF Archive of Commission Membership
 PDF Analysis of Political Experience of Commission Membership by UK politician Tom King and the Centre for Policy Studies

 
European Commissions